This is a list of Hindu temples in France:

Paris
 Ganesha Hindu Temple, 17, rue Pajol Paris France 75018
 Sri Ashtalakshmi Thevasthanam, 1 bis, Rue Ledru Rollin, Choisy-le-Roi 94600
Sri Sri Radha Parisisvara Temple, 230 Av de la General Leclerc, 95200 Sarcelles, Paris, France
Sivan Parvathi, 159 Avenue Paul Vaillant Couturier, 93120 La Courneuve
Sri Durgai Amman Temple Villiers Le Bel,15 Avenue Alexis Varagne, 95400 Villiers-le-Bel
Sri Sathya Narayana Pathunga Temple, 6-8 Avenue Anatole France, 94600 Choisy-le-Roi

Luçay-le-Mâle 
 ISKCON Temple.

Lyon
 Temple Hindou de Vinayaga Perouman Koil, 3 Place Lyautey, 69140 Rillieux-la-Pape, France

Saint-Denis, Réunion
 Sri Maha Kalakambal Temple, 261 Rue du Maréchal Leclerc, Saint-Denis 97400, Réunion

Sarcelles 
 Radha Krishna Temple, 230 Avenue de la Division Leclerc, 95200 Sarcelles

References

External link 

 

 
Hindu temples
Hinduism in France
France